Filippo Bellini (c. 1550/1555 – 1604) was an Italian painter from Urbino who was strongly influenced by artist Federico Barocci.  He is known for his painting of Pope Sixtus V.  Bellini worked mostly in the Marche and in Romagne regions of Italy.  His paintings are mostly located in churches and museums in the province of Ancona and in Macerata.

References

1550s births
1604 deaths
People from Urbino
16th-century Italian painters
Italian male painters
17th-century Italian painters
Umbrian painters
Italian Renaissance painters